International Series may refer to:

NFL International Series, the NFL London Games in London and the NFL Mexico Game in Mexico City
ATP International Series, a series of professional tennis tournaments held 2000–2008

See also
International GTSprint Series, a grand tourer-style sports car racing held 2010–2014
International Open Series, a series of snooker tournaments held 2001–2010
International Rules Series, a senior men's international rules football competition between Australia and Ireland
 International Sedan Series, a stock car racing series created by NASCAR
 International Superstars Series, touring car racing championship held 2004–2013